Marc Akerstream (May 24, 1954August 15, 1998) was a Canadian actor best known as Tony in the 1995 martial arts film Rumble in the Bronx, starring Jackie Chan. He was also a stuntman.

He died of head injuries while on the set of the Canadian television series The Crow: Stairway to Heaven. The accident occurred during filming at Minaty Bay, Vancouver, British Columbia, when he was hit by flying debris while observing an explosion of a rowboat.

Filmography

References

External links
 

1954 births
1998 deaths
20th-century Canadian male actors
Canadian male film actors
Canadian stunt performers
Male actors from Vancouver
Accidental deaths in British Columbia
Deaths from head injury